Beyond a Dream is the tenth studio album by Christian singer-songwriter Twila Paris, released in late 1993 by Star Song Records. Paris reunited with producer Brown Bannister, who produced her 1990 album Cry for the Desert and also with Paul Mills who produced two tracks from her 1992 compilation album A Heart That Knows You. The album topped the Billboard Top Christian Albums chart, giving Paris her first number-one album. In 1995, Paris won her third-consecutive Female Vocalist of the Year title and also won Song of the Year for writing her number-one Christian AC hit "God Is in Control" at the 26th GMA Dove Awards. Music videos were made for "God Is in Control" and "What Am I Without You?"

Track listing 
All songs written by Twila Paris.
"God Is in Control" - 5:45
"Watch and Pray" - 5:29
"Neither Will I" - 5:16
"All About You" - 5:48
"Visitor from Heaven" - 4:57
"Seventy Years Ago" - 5:24
"I Will Worship" - 3:31
"All My Heart" - 4:41
"Rescue the Prisoner" - 4:19
"What Am I Without You?" - 5:23
"The Light is Shining" - 3:06

Personnel 
 Twila Paris – lead vocals, backing vocals (5, 7)
 Alan Pasqua – keyboards 
 Blair Masters – keyboards (1, 2, 3, 7, 8, 9), horns (1)
 John Barlow Jarvis – acoustic piano (1, 2, 4, 6-9)
 Carl Marsh – horns (1), strings (5, 6, 10), tin whistle (7), additional keyboards (10)
 Shane Keister – acoustic piano (3, 5, 10, 11)
 Paul Mills – keyboards (5, 10, 11)
 Tom Hemby – acoustic guitar (1, 2, 4, 6, 7), mandolin (6, 7), dobro (9)
 Dann Huff – electric guitar (1-10)
 Jerry McPherson – electric guitar (1-10)
 Wayne Kirkpatrick – acoustic guitar (3), backing vocals (3)
 Tommy Sims – bass (4, 5, 6)
 Paul Leim – drums (1-10)
 Terry McMillan – percussion (2, 3)
 Chris Eaton – backing vocals (1-4, 6, 7, 9)
 Michael Mellett – backing vocals (1, 4, 7, 9)
 Chris Rodriguez – backing vocals (1-4, 8, 9)
 Lisa Bevill – backing vocals (2)
 Michael Black – backing vocals (2, 4)
 Kelly Willard – backing vocals (6)

Production
 Darrell A. Harris – executive producer 
 Brown Bannister – producer, overdub recording, mixing (11)
 Paul Mills – producer, overdub recording, mixing (11)
 Jeff Balding – track recording, mixing (1-9)
 Steve Bishir – overdub recording 
 Lynn Fuston – mixing (10)
 Carry Summers – track recording assistant, mix assistant 
 Paula Montondo – mix assistant 
 Wayne Mehl – overdub recording assistant 
 Martin Woodlee – overdub recording assistant 
 Doug Sax – mastering at The Mastering Lab (Hollywood, California)
 Vicki Dvoracek – A&R 
 Traci Sterling – production coordinator 
 Toni Fitzpenn – art direction 
 The Riordon Design Group, Inc. – art direction 
 Mark Tucker – photography 
 Proper Management – management

Critical reception 

Thom Granger of AllMusic said that Paris "spun a few heads with this one, featuring her most contemporary material to date, and a bit of a new and more confident vocal approach to match it."

Chris Berry of Cross Rhythms said that with a little help from Brown Bannister, Paris "has re-invented herself as a CCM, rather than a MOR, singer and surged back with a brilliant, hook-filled set of radio-friendly songs which will surely prove to be her most successful album ever." Berry also said that Paris' "best songs have always been those intimate, baring the soul numbers and she doesn't disappoint. 'Neither Will I' is as surefire a No 1 hit in the US CCM chart as I have heard in ages. If you've grown up thinking Amy Grant held all the aces in this department then think again, Twila's up there too."

Charts

Year-end charts

Radio singles

Accolades 
GMA Dove Awards
Female Vocalist of the Year

References 

1993 albums
Twila Paris albums
Albums produced by Brown Bannister